Jake William Brimmer (born 3 April 1998) is an Australian footballer who plays as a central midfielder for Melbourne Victory.

Club career
Brimmer began to show his skills at the Rowville Sports Academy and with his junior club Nunawading City before joining the FFV NTC program. Continuing to impress, Brimmer was in talks of a contract with Melbourne Victory before being spotted by Liverpool scout Barry Hunter, and subsequently signed a three-year deal for his childhood team. On 10 June 2017, he was released by Liverpool.

On 31 July 2017, Brimmer returned to Australia, joining A-League side Perth Glory. In October 2020, Brimmer left Perth Glory for family reasons.

On 9 October 2020, Brimmer was transferred to A-League side Melbourne Victory.

In his debut season with the Victory, Brimmer made 25 appearances, finishing with 5 goals and 5 assists; alongside Rudy Gestede and Elvis Kamsoba, Brimmer finished as Melbourne Victory's joint top goalscorer for the 2020–21 season.

Brimmer started for the Victory in the 2021 FFA Cup Final against the Central Coast Mariners at AAMI Park on 5 February 2022. The Victory prevailed 2–1 to win the 2021 FFA Cup, achieving Brimmer's first trophy with the Victory, as well as the Victory's second FFA Cup title. This was the last edition of the competition under the FFA Cup name; from 2022, the competition will be known as the Australia Cup. Brimmer was the joint recipient of the Mark Viduka Medal along with Kye Rowles.

International career
Brimmer has featured on numerous occasions for the Australian U-17 side. During the 2014 AFC U-16 Championship, he scored two goals in a 4–2 win over Japan. He was selected in the Australian squad for the 2015 FIFA U-17 World Cup.

On 29 September 2016, Brimmer was called up for the Australian U-20 side for the 2016 AFC U-19 Championship.

Style of play
Brimmer has been described as an all-action midfielder who is capable of scoring goals, and has a good habit of being in the right place at the right time. He has also been described as having a great passing range and technical ability.

Honours

Club
Perth Glory
 A-League: Premiers 2018–19

Melbourne Victory
FFA Cup: 2021

Individual
 2018 Dylan Tombides Young Player of the Year (Football West 2018 End of Season Awards)
 Mark Viduka Medal: 2021
A-Leagues All Star: 2022
 Johnny Warren Medal: 2021–22
 PFA A-League Team of the Season: 2021–22
Victory Medal: 2021–22

Personal life
Brimmer is of Maltese and Scottish ancestry. Brimmer is married to Brianna and has two daughters, Delilah and Hazel.

References

External links
 
 

1998 births
Living people
Association football midfielders
Australian soccer players
Australia youth international soccer players
Australia under-20 international soccer players
Liverpool F.C. players
Perth Glory FC players
Melbourne Victory FC players
Australian people of Maltese descent
Australian people of German descent
National Premier Leagues players
A-League Men players
Soccer players from Melbourne